William Hay, 3rd Earl of Erroll  ( –  14 January 1507) was a Scottish peer. He was the third Earl of Erroll and the fourth Lord Hay of Erroll.

Biography

William Hay was the son of William Hay, 1st Earl of Erroll and his wife, Beatrix,  daughter of James Douglas, 7th Earl of Douglas. He was the great-great grandson of King Robert II of Scotland and his first wife, Elizabeth Mure.

He inherited the earldom after the death of his older brother,  Nicholas, in 1470.

He was a member of the King James III's Privy Council and a commissioner for the 1482 peace treaty with England.

Marriage and issue

He married first Lady Isabel Gordon, daughter of George Gordon, 2nd Earl of Huntly and Princess Annabella of Scotland, daughter of King James I of Scotland. They had three sons and one daughter:

William Hay, 4th Earl of Erroll, killed with his brother at the Battle of Flodden, 9 September 1513.  He married Christian Lyon, daughter of John Lyon, 3rd Lord Glamis, and had issue:
William Hay, 5th Earl of Erroll
Thomas Hay of Logie, killed at Flodden. He married Margaret Logie, daughter of Lyon Logie of that Ilk, and had issue:
George Hay, 7th Earl of Erroll
Beatrix Hay
John Hay
Lady Beatrix Hay, contracted to marry eldest son of Sir William Keith of Inverugie

He married secondly Lady Elizabeth Leslie, daughter of George Leslie, 1st Earl of Rothes. They had two sons and one daughter:

John II Hay
William Hay of Lesk
Lady Elizabeth Hay, married David Lindsay, 8th Earl of Crawford

References

 

1449 births
1507 deaths
03
William, 03
Members of the Privy Council of Scotland
15th-century Scottish people